Ussuri usually refers to the Ussuri River, a river in the east of Northeast China and south of the Russian Far East, but may also refer to:

Ussuri Bay, a northern east part of Peter the Great Gulf
Ussuri krai
Ussuri Railway
Ussuri Highway, M60 highway (Russia)
Ussuri tiger, the Siberian or Amur tiger (Panthera tigris altaica)